Jacob Lassen (born 11 September 1995) is a Danish handball player for HSV Hamburg and the Danish national team.

He made his debut on the Danish national team on 28 April 2021, against Switzerland.

On 26 October 2021, it was announced that Lassen had signed a contract with German HSV Hamburg.

References

External links

1995 births
Living people
Danish male handball players
People from Randers
Sportspeople from the Central Denmark Region